Molluscs of Venezuela may refer to:

List of introduced molluscs of Venezuela
List of molluscs of Falcón State, Venezuela
List of marine molluscs of Venezuela
List of non-marine molluscs of Venezuela
List of non-marine molluscs of El Hatillo Municipality, Miranda, Venezuela